Feliks Franciszek Kostrzębski (10 May 1899 – 19 June 1954) was a Polish cyclist. He competed in two events at the 1924 Summer Olympics.

References

External links
 

1899 births
1954 deaths
Polish male cyclists
Olympic cyclists of Poland
Cyclists at the 1924 Summer Olympics
Sportspeople from Lviv
Polish Austro-Hungarians
People from the Kingdom of Galicia and Lodomeria